Cathedral of San Giusto can refer to one of the following religious buildings in Italy:

Susa Cathedral, dedicated to Saint Justus of Novalesa
Trieste Cathedral, dedicated to Saint Justus of Trieste